Teymanak may refer to:
 Teymanak-e Olya
 Teymanak-e Sofla